Found and Lost may refer to:

Found and Lost (opera), 2016 opera by Emily Hall
Found and Lost (Twilight Zone), 2002 episode of The Twilight Zone

See also
Lost and Found (disambiguation)